Lauri Baldomero Hermoso Herrera (born 15 March 1975), commonly known as Mere, is a Spanish retired footballer who played as a central defender, and is a manager.

Club career
Born in El Puerto de Santa María, Cádiz, Andalusia, Mere made his first team debut with Cádiz CF at the age of just 19. In 1998, after being sparingly used, he moved to fellow Segunda División B side Algeciras CF, suffering relegation at the end of the campaign.

Mere resumed his career in his native region, representing Motril CF, Granada CF, CD Mensajero, Jerez Industrial CF and Racing Club Portuense. He retired with the latter in 2005, aged 30.

Managerial career
Shortly after retiring Mere started working as a coach, being José Luis Burgueña's assistant at last club Portuense. In December 2011, he was appointed manager of Puerto Real CF in Primera Andaluza, and took the club to a second place finish.

Mere returned to Portuense on 3 June 2012, being named manager of the main squad in Tercera División. Subsequently, he was also in charge of Conil CF before being appointed at another club he represented as a player, Algeciras, on 25 June 2014.

Mere achieved promotion to the third division in 2015, but was sacked on 28 March of the following year. On 1 August 2016 he returned to Cádiz, being named manager of the reserves in the fifth tier. 

On 27 June 2018, after achieving two consecutive promotions, Mere announced his departure from Cádiz, and was appointed manager of CF Fuenlabrada on 23 July. With the latter, he achieved a first-ever promotion to Segunda División after defeating Recreativo de Huelva in the play-offs, then sealed the league championship with a win over Racing de Santander.

Mere's first professional match occurred on 17 August 2019, with his side achieving a 2–0 win over Elche CF at the Estadio Manuel Martínez Valero. Despite staying in the play-off zone in the first months of the season, he was dismissed on 10 March of the following year, after 13 winless matches.

Remaining in the Community of Madrid and the second division, Mere was hired at AD Alcorcón for the 2020–21 season, but was sacked on 9 November 2020 after eight consecutive losses. The following 24 June, he took over UD Logroñés, freshly relegated to Primera División RFEF.

Sacked by Logroñés on 3 April 2022, Mere returned to Fuenla on 2 June, with the club now also in the third division.

Managerial statistics

Honours
Fuenlabrada
Segunda División B: 2018–19

References

External links

Stats and bio at Cadistas1910 

1975 births
Living people
People from El Puerto de Santa María
Sportspeople from the Province of Cádiz
Spanish footballers
Footballers from Andalusia
Association football defenders
Tercera División players
Cádiz CF B players
Cádiz CF players
Algeciras CF footballers
Motril CF players
Granada CF footballers
CD Mensajero players
Jerez Industrial CF players
Racing Club Portuense players
Spanish football managers
Segunda División managers
Primera Federación managers
Segunda División B managers
Tercera División managers
CF Fuenlabrada managers
AD Alcorcón managers
UD Logroñés managers